North Side High School Gym was an indoor gymnasium in Fort Wayne, Indiana.  It hosted the NBA's Fort Wayne Pistons from 1941 until they moved to the War Memorial Coliseum in 1952.  The gymnasium held near 3,000 people and hosted games for North Side High School in Fort Wayne through 2004 when the school was renovated. The teams at North Side now play in a new gym, By Hey Arena, and the old facility was transformed into the school's library in the renovation.

Basketball venues in Indiana
Former National Basketball Association venues
Basketball Association of America venues
National Basketball League (United States) venues
Fort Wayne Zollner Pistons
Fort Wayne General Electrics